Perpetual beta is the keeping of software or a system at the beta development stage for an extended or indefinite period of time. It is often used by developers when they continue to release new features that might not be fully tested. Perpetual beta software is not recommended for mission critical machines. However, many operational systems find this to be a much more rapid and agile approach to development, staging, and deployment.

Definition

Perpetual beta has come to be associated with the development and release of a service in which constant updates are the foundation for the habitability or usability of a service.  According to publisher and open source advocate Tim O'Reilly:

Users must be treated as co-developers, in a reflection of open source development practices (even if the software in question is unlikely to be released under an open source license.) The open source dictum, "release early and release often", in fact has morphed into an even more radical position, "the perpetual beta", in which the product is developed in the open, with new features slipstreamed in on a monthly, weekly, or even daily basis. It's no accident that services such as Gmail, Google Maps, Flickr, del.icio.us, and the like may be expected to bear a "Beta" logo for years at a time.

Used in the larger conversation of what defines Web 2.0, O'Reilly described the concept of perpetual beta as part of a customized Internet environment with these applications as distinguishing characteristics:

 Services, not packaged software, with cost-effective scalability
 Control over unique, hard-to-recreate data sources that get richer as more people use them
 Trusting users as co-developers
 Harnessing collective intelligence
 Leveraging the long tail through customer self-service
 Software above the level of a single device
 Lightweight user interfaces, development models, and business models.

See also
Continuous improvement process

References

Web 2.0 neologisms
Software release